Nandeshwar is a village of Maharashtra state in Solapur district in Mangalwedha tehsil.

Demographics
Nandeshwar grampanchayat was established in 1960 under the Maharashtra government in Solapur district. The present sarpanch of this village is Sajabai Dada Garande.

The population of this village is approximately 10,000. The village is passes through by m.s.h.171 Jath-Mangalwedha state highway and main district road Sangole-Nandeshwar-Chadchan road.

The town is divided into several areas:
Mashner Vasti
Jharewadi
Harshbodhinagar
Indiranagr
Balkrishna nagar
jaibhavaninagar
Hanuman galli
Kumbhar-chambhar galli.
 Jankarvasti
Patil Vasti bhose-road
 Metakari Vasti Siddhankeri road

Location
It is located on 18 km from Mangalwedha tehsil and 73 km from Solapur district. Sangole is west on 22 km and Jath is south on 38 km.

Infrastructure

Banks
Bank of Maharashtra, Nandeshwar
DCC Bank
Dhanshri mahila bank
Kondiram Maharaj co-op bank Nandeshwar
Lokmangal Bank
Chetana Patsanstha

Schools
 Shri balkrishna vidyalaya & Jr.collage nandeshwar
 Z.P. primary school nandeshwar
 z.p. school lavatevasti
Z.P. School Bandgarwadi
Z.P. School Masnerwasti
Z.P. School Zarewadi

Hospitals
There are several hospitals in Nandeshwar. A government rural hospital are also available in Nandeshwar.

References

Cities and towns in Solapur district